Geen paniek is a 1973 Dutch film directed by Ko Koedijk.

Cast
 Rijk de Gooyer as Rijk
 John Kraaykamp as Johnny
 Hetty Blok as Tante Toetje Kluif
 Trudy Labij as Hoertje Kitty
 Marielle Fiolet as Hoertje Roosje
 Hans Boskamp as Henkie Blaffert
 Frans Kokshoorn as Koster
 Niek Engelschman as Pen
 Ton Vos as Rudolf
 Eddie Constantine as Bill Silkstocking, Amerikaans zakenman
 Jon Bluming		
 Maya Bouma		
 Rita Corita as Tante Ali

External links 

 

Dutch comedy films
1973 films
1970s Dutch-language films